An electric bus is a bus that is propelled using electric motors as opposed to an internal combustion engine. Electric buses can store the needed electricity on-board, or be fed continuously from an external source. The majority of buses storing electricity are battery electric buses (which this article mostly deals with), where the electric motor obtains energy from an onboard battery pack, although examples of other storage modes do exist, such as the gyrobus which uses flywheel energy storage. When electricity is not stored on board, it is supplied by contact with outside power sources. For example, overhead wires as in the trolleybus, or with a ground-level power supply, or through inductive charging.

As of 2019, 99% of all battery electric buses in the world have been deployed in Mainland China, with more than 421,000 buses on the road, which is 17% of China's total bus fleet. For comparison, the United States had 300, and Europe had 2,250. 

By 2021, Europe had reached 8,500 electric buses, and China's share of electric buses remained at 98%.

History

Principles

Battery

One of the most popular types of electric buses nowadays are battery electric buses. Battery electric buses have the electricity stored on board the vehicle in a battery. , battery electric buses could have a range of over 280 km with just one charge, although extreme temperatures and hills can reduce range. The buses are usually used in cities due to their limited range.

City driving involves a great deal of accelerating and braking. Due to that, the battery electric bus is superior to diesel bus as it can recharge most of the kinetic energy back into batteries during braking, which reduces brake wear. The use of electric over diesel propulsion reduces noise and pollution in cities.

When operating within a city, it is important to minimize the unloaded and rolling weight of the bus. This can be accomplished by using aluminium as the main construction material. Composite paneling and other lightweight materials can also be used. According to Finnish bus manufacturer Linkker, its fully aluminium bus construction is about 3000 kg lighter than comparably sized modern steel buses, which have a curb weight of 9500 kg. Reducing weight allows for a greater payload and reduces wear to components such as brakes, tires, and joints, achieving cost savings for the operator.

Charging 

Buses may be charged at plug in stations, or on special wireless charging pads.

Sweden is studying four different dynamic charging technologies that allow buses and other vehicles to charge while driving on roads and highways. The four tested technologies are overhead wires, in-road rail, on-road rail, and in-road inductive coils.

The first solar powered microgrid for charging electric buses in the US is under construction in Montgomery County, MD, and scheduled for completion in fall of 2022.

Capacitors 

Buses can use capacitors instead of batteries to store their energy.
Ultracapacitors can only store about 5 percent of the energy that lithium-ion batteries hold for the same weight, limiting them to a short distance per charge.
However ultracapacitors can charge and discharge much more rapidly than conventional batteries.
In vehicles that have to stop frequently and predictably as part of normal operation, energy storage based exclusively on ultracapacitors can be a solution.

China is experimenting with a new form of electric bus, known as Capabus, which runs without continuous overhead lines by using power stored in large on-board electric double-layer capacitors, which are quickly recharged whenever the vehicle stops at any bus stop (under so-called electric umbrellas), and fully charged in the terminus.

A few prototypes were being tested in Shanghai in early 2005.  In 2006, two commercial bus routes began to use electric double-layer capacitor buses; one of them is route 11 in Shanghai.  In 2009, Sinautec Automobile Technologies, based in Arlington, VA, and its Chinese partner, Shanghai Aowei Technology Development Company are testing with 17 forty-one seat Ultracap Buses serving the Greater Shanghai area since 2006 without any major technical problems.  Another 60 buses will be delivered early next year with ultracapacitors that supply 10 watt-hours per kilogram.

The buses have very predictable routes and need to stop regularly, every , allowing opportunities for quick recharging.
The trick is to turn some bus stops along the route into charging stations.  At these stations, a collector on the top of the bus rises and touches an overhead charging line.  Within a couple of minutes, the ultracapacitor banks stored under the bus seats are fully charged.  The buses can also capture energy from braking, and the company says that recharging stations can be equipped with solar panels.  A third generation of the product, will give  of range per charge or better.
 Such a bus was delivered by Chariot Motors in Sofia, Bulgaria in May 2014 for 9 months' test. It covers 23 km in 2 charges.

Sinautec estimates that one of its buses has one-tenth the energy cost of a diesel bus and can achieve lifetime fuel savings of $200,000.  Also, the buses use 40 percent less electricity compared to an electric trolley bus, mainly because they are lighter and have the regenerative braking benefits.  The ultracapacitors are made of activated carbon, and have an energy density of six watt-hours per kilogram (for comparison, a high-performance lithium-ion battery can achieve 200 watt-hours per kilogram), but the ultracapacitor bus is also cheaper than lithium-ion battery buses, about 40 percent less expensive, with a far superior reliability rating.

There is also a plug-in hybrid version, which also uses ultracaps.

Future developments

Sinautec is in discussions with MIT's Schindall about developing ultracapacitors of higher energy density using vertically aligned carbon nanotube structures that give the devices more surface area for holding a charge.  So far, they are able to get twice the energy density of an existing ultracapacitor, but they are trying to get about five times.  This would create an ultracapacitor with one-quarter of the energy density of a lithium-ion battery.

Future developments includes the use of inductive charging under the street, to avoid overhead wiring.  A pad under each bus stop and at each stop light along the way would be used.

Drawbacks
As with other electric vehicles, climate control and extremely cold weather will weaken the performance of electric buses. In addition, terrain may pose a challenge to the adoption of electric vehicles that carry stored energy compared to trolleybuses, which draw power from overhead lines. Also, compared to trolleybuses, battery electric buses have lower passenger capacity because the weight of the batteries increases axle loads in jurisdictions where there are legal axle load limits on roads. Even when conditions are favorable, internal combustion engine buses are frequently diesel powered, and diesel is relatively inexpensive per mile. High local utility rates (especially during periods of peak demand) and proprietary charging systems pose barriers to adoption.

Makers and models

School use

North America

In 2014, the first production-model all-electric school bus was delivered to the Kings Canyon Unified School District in California's San Joaquin Valley. The Class-A school bus was built by Trans Tech Bus, using an electric powertrain control system developed by Motiv Power Systems, of Foster City, California. The bus was one of four the district ordered. The first round of SST-e buses (as they are called) is partly funded by the AB 118 Air Quality Improvement Program administered by the California Air Resources Board.

The Trans Tech/Motiv vehicle has passed all KCUSD and California Highway Patrol inspections and certifications. Although some diesel hybrids are in use, this is the first modern electric school bus approved for student transportation by any state.

Since 2015, the Canadian manufacturer Lion Bus offers a full size school bus, eLion, with a body made out of composites. It is a regular production version that is built and shipped in volume since early 2016, with around 50 units sold until 2017.

In February 2021, there were about 300 electric schoolbuses in operation in the United States. That month, Montgomery County, Maryland approved a contract to transition its 1,400 vehicle schoolbus fleet to electric buses by 2035, with the first 25 buses arriving in fall 2021.

The 2021 Infrastructure Investment and Jobs Act included $2.5 billion in funding for electric school buses, to be distributed over five years.

By June 2022, 38 US states were using electric schoolbuses.

In September 2022, EPA funding for electric schoolbuses was doubled, from $500 million to almost $1 billion, due to high demand. The improvement in air quality over diesel powered school buses is expected to be helpful for children with asthma. In addition, the BIDIRECTIONAL Act was introduced in the US Senate, to "create a program dedicated to deploying electric school buses with bidirectional vehicle-to-grid (V2G) flow capability.”

Transit use

Transit authorities that use battery buses or other types of all-electric buses, other than trolleybuses:

Asia

UAE 

The UAE has recently introduced electric buses. The busses are public buses which serve Dubai.

Malaysia 

 Bandar Sunway
 Kuala Lumpur
 Putrajaya
 Melaka City
 Selangor
 Kota Kinabalu (coming soon 2018)
 Kota Bharu (coming soon 2018)
 Kuching (on trial since 1 March 2019)

Indonesia 
 TransJakarta plans to replace aging fleet with newer electric powered buses. Available candidates are locally made MAB buses and imported BYD buses. Technical trials started by September 2019.
 Paiton Energy took delivery of the first locally produced electric bus made by PT MAB.

India 

Highlights:
 On 6 March 2014, India's first intra-city e-bus was launched in Bengaluru.
 On 17 October 2016, Ashok Leyland unveiled India’s first indigenous e-bus.
 On 8 August 2019, Government of India sanctioned 5,595 e-buses to 64 cities and state transport undertakings.
On 5 September 2019, India's first inter-city e-bus service, from Mumbai to Pune, was launched.
Cities using electric buses include:

 Ahmedabad, Gujarat
 Bangalore, Karnataka
 Chandigarh
 Delhi NCR
 Hyderabad Metropolitan Region
 Mumbai Metropolitan Region
 Pune, Maharashtra

Iran
 Iran's first electric bus was launched in Tehran in 2021 with the brand name of SHETAB. It is the vehicle designed with PLM technology in Iran.

China 

As of 2016, 156,000 buses are being put into service per year in China. As of the end of 2020, 378,700 electric buses were in operation, accounting for 53.8% of the total amount of buses.

 Beijing
 Bengbu
 Changsha (BYD x 180 vehicles)
 Haikou (BYD)
 Lhasa, First solar powered public bus in 2015
 Shanghai  (capabuses)
 Shaoguan (BYD)
 Shenzhen (BYD x 16,359 vehicles). As of 1 January 2018, every bus in Shenzhen is battery-electric.
 Tianjin (BYD)
 Xi'an (BYD)
 Yancheng
 Bengbu (BYD x 638 vehicles)

Japan 

 Community Bus "Hamurun" (Operated by Nishi Tokyo Bus) in Hamura, Tokyo since 10 March 2012
 Community Bus "Sumida Hyakkei" (Operated by Keisei Bus) in Sumida, Tokyo since 20 March 2012
 Kitakyushu City, Japan.

Singapore

 Singapore's first fully electric bus was launched in 2016 on a trial basis by Go-Ahead Singapore.
 On 24 October 2018, the Land Transport Authority procured 60 fully electric buses — 20 BYD K9 buses, 20 ST Engineering-Linkker Electric Buses, 10 Yutong E12 single-decker buses and 10 Yutong E12DD double-decker buses, for $50.64 million total.
 On 17 October 2019, SMRT Buses began deploying BYD C6 electric minibuses on bus service 825, marking the launch of Singapore's first fully electric public minibuses.
 On 3 April 2020, Go-Ahead Singapore, Tower Transit Singapore and SMRT Buses began deploying Yutong E12 electric buses, marking the start of the rollout of the 60 fully electric buses procured by the Land Transport Authority.
 On 29 July 2020, SBS Transit began deploying BYD K9 electric buses.
 On 27 October 2020, Go-Ahead Singapore, Tower Transit Singapore and SMRT Buses began deploying Yutong E12DD electric double-decker buses, marking the launch of Singapore's first fully electric double-decker buses.

South Korea 

 Seoul has 15 electric buses nicknamed "Peanut Bus" for their shape, transferring people from subway stations in downtown to the N Seoul Tower, circulating Mt. Namsan.
 Seoul's Gangnam District will have 11 electric buses in operation from February 2013 and 270 electric buses by the end of 2013, increasing to 400 buses by 2014. At least 3,500 electric buses will be introduced in phases until 2020, which will account for half of Seoul's bus fleet.
 Gumi will have the world's first wireless electric bus, known as Online Electric Vehicle, in operation from July 2013 developed by KAIST. Electricity is wirelessly fed into the bus from the tracks.
 Pohang will have automatically battery switching electric buses in operation from July 2013. Unlike conventional plug-in charging buses, the battery pack is automatically swapped with a fully charged one before complete drainage.

Thailand 

 Thai Smile Bus Co.,Ltd.

Qatar 
741 electric buses are operated by Mowasalat (Karwa) the country’s public transit system.

Europe
The largest European electric bus fleet is concentrated in Moscow which has 500 electric buses as of October 2020.

Belarus 

 Е433 «Vitovt Max Electro» (Minsk)
 E420
 E321

Belgium
The electrification of Belgium's buses is on a strong upward trend:
 Flanders: At the end of 2019 De Lijn operated 2,295 buses, of which 368 were hybrids. De Lijn introduced its first six fully electric buses in 2020, with seven more to follow. An order for 970 electric buses, which had been cancelled, is to be reissued. The Flemish coalition agreement states that city centres must be operated emission-free by 2025 and that all buses in Flanders must be zero-emission by 2035.
 Wallonia: At the end of 2019, OTW operated 1,769 of its own buses, of which 309 were hybrids.
 Brussels: At the end of 2019 STIB/MIVB operated 800 buses, of which 184 (23%) of them were hybrids. Tenders for 50–100 electric buses are being prepared and the hydrogen option is also being examined. 
As for fully electric buses, Belgium only had 4 in operation in 2019.

Bulgaria 
 Since 2018 Sofia operates a fleet of 20 Yutong battery electric buses
 Since 2020 Sofia operates a fleet of 15 Chariot-Higer supercapacitor-based electric buses. In 2021 the fleet was supplemented by 30 more electric vehicles of this type.
 Since February 2021 Kazanlak operates a fleet of 7 Alfabus battery electric buses
 Since February 2021 Gabrovo operates a fleet of 3 Chariot-Higer supercapacitor-based electric buses, delivered by Chariot Motors.
 Since July 2021 Ruse operates a fleet of 20 SOR battery electric buses.

Turkey 
 Anadolu Isuzu
 BMC
 Bozankaya
 Karsan
 Otokar
 Temsa

Finland 
 Espoo Cobus EL2500 (bus 11 Friisilä-Tapiola Centre)
 Espoo (Linkker 2 vehicles, Bus 11 line Tapiola centre-Friisilä)

France 
 RATP (Paris): Line 341 is the first line of 100% electric full-size Bluebuses.

Germany 
 Berlin: Berlin public transport(Berliner Verkehrsbetriebe (BVG)) operator orders 90 new electric buses. It is still unclear which manufacturer the vehicles were ordered from. As the local German newspaper, the Tagesspiegel writes, the order is said to have gone to the Dutch electric bus and charging infrastructure manufacturer Ebusco. The delivery of all buses is scheduled for the end of 2022. This will increase BVG’s fleet to 228 electric buses.
 Munich: The Dutch electric bus manufacturer Ebusco has received a follow-up order from public transport operator Stadtwerke München in Germany. The order is for 14 electric 18-metre buses of the type Ebusco 2.2. Delivery is scheduled for the first half of 2023. “After the 12-metre buses from Ebusco met the range expectation, we are looking forward to taking its big brother on the road,” says Veit Bodenschatz, Managing Director and Head of Bus Operations at Münchner Verkehrsgesellschaft (MVG). In Munich, the aforementioned twelve Ebusco 2.2 are already in use as solo buses in the 12-metre version, as well as two Ebusco 3.0, which, as reported, were recently handed over to Stadtwerke.
 Konstanz: Stadtwerke Konstanz has purchased six new electric buses as a prelude to the long-term conversion of its bus fleet. The new Mercedes eCitaro e-buses have already been delivered and are scheduled to enter service on lines 6 and 14 in February. The municipal utility had already announced in October 2020 that it intended to purchase six e-buses in 2021 and to stop buying diesel buses in the future. The order was then placed with Mercedes-Benz last year, and the red-painted eCitaro buses have since arrived in Constance.

Great Britain 
 , 785 battery electric and 22 hydrogen fuel cell buses operate in London, the 2nd largest fleet in Europe.
 Stagecoach North Scotland operates 5 Optare solo EV
 Strathclyde Partnership for Transport runs battery-powered electric buses on one route in Glasgow, between George Square and the Transport Museum.
 Bristol: Route 72 from City Centre to Frenchay  UWE campus
 Durham: Cathedral and City Centre loop
 Milton Keynes: Route 7
 Greater Manchester: Stagecoach plans to buy 105 electric buses for use in the Greater Manchester area by 2020.
 Guildford introduced a fleet of electric buses on its Park and Ride services on 7 January 2019.
 Newcastle: Go North East started operation of Yutong E10s under the Voltra brand name on routes 53 and 54 in June 2021.
Since July 2020, National Express West Midlands has been operating 19 fully electric ADL/BYD double deckers on the 6 route from Birmingham to Solihull, via Hall Green and Shirley
Since August 2020, National Express Coventry has been operating 10 fully electric ADL/BYD double deckers on the 9/9A route between University Hospital and Finham, via Coventry rail station and Coventry Pool Meadow bus station.

Italy 

 Azienda Trasporti Bergamo — Bergamo, Italy
 Gruppo Torinese Trasporti — Turin, Italy, uses small capacitor vehicles on two routes ("Star1" and "Star2") through city center since early 2000.
 Azienda Trasporti Milanesi, the company responsible for public transportation in Milan, has ordered 250 electric buses in 2019, and plans to be fully electrified by 2030. As of 2019, there are 25 electric buses, 100 hybrid buses and 3 hydrogen buses in operation in the city.

Israel 

 Israel has 78 electric buses, out of a fleet of ~13,000 buses
 Dan, a public transport operator in Tel Aviv launched e-bus operation on 15 September 2016 with five Chariot ultracapacitor e-buses on Route 4. After 2017, Dan put other four Chariot e-buses with 32kWh ultracapacitors into service. In late 2018 and 2020 it put 19 and 10 new ultracapacitor e-buses with 40 kWh ultracapacitors into service. By late 2020, 37 Chariot electric buses operated in Tel Aviv.

Lithuania 
 Municipal public transport company "Klaipėdos autobusų parkas", Klaipėda, started using locally produced Dancer electric buses on Route 8 in April 2020.
 Municipal public transport company "Kauno autobusai", Kaunas, operates electric trolleybuses since 1965. As of April 2020, the company operated around 100 Solaris Trollino 12AC and several Berkhof Premier AT18 trolleybuses on a network of 17 lines. 
 Municipal public transport company "Tauragės autobusų parkas", Tauragė in March 2019 announced the acquisition of electric Iveco Rosero 70C18 and Solaris Urbino Electric buses. A total of 5 electric buses were launched on three suburban routes in early 2020.
 Municipal public transport company "Susisiekimo paslaugos", Vilnius, began using four Karsan Jest Electric buses on Route 89 in September 2019, making this route fully electric. This is an addition to the network of 19 routes, operated with 279 electric trolleybuses, mostly Solaris Trollino 15AC, Solaris Trollino IV 12, Škoda 14Tr, Škoda 14ТrМ, Škoda 15Тr and Amber Vilnis 12 AC, as of April 2020. Vilnius trolleybus network was launched in 1956.

Netherlands 

The Netherlands has the most electric buses of any European country. At the end of 2019 the number had reached 770, or 15% of the entire Dutch fleet of 5,236 buses. This is expected to grow to 1,388 by the end of 2020. In the provinces of Groningen and Drenthe 47% of buses are electric, in Limburg 37% and in North Holland 31%. The main manufacturers are VDL (486 of the existing 770) Ebusco (110), Heuliez (49) and BYD (44). In 2015, the Dutch public transport authorities agreed to buy only emission-free buses from 2025 onwards, and to make the entire fleet emission-free by 2030.

Amsterdam
In December 2018 GVB ordered 31 electric buses from VDL, with an option for 69 more buses. They entered service on 2 April 2020 on routes 15, 22 and 36, and are
 9 Citeas SLF-120 Electric, with 216 kWh batteries
 22 articulated Citeas SLFA-180 Electric, with 288 kWh batteries

The buses recharge through a pantograph from 31 8 MW Heliox fast chargers at the Garage West depot on Jan Tooropstraat and seven 45 kW chargers at Sloterdijk station.
EBS (Egged Bus Systems), which primarily serves Waterland to the north of Amsterdam, has also ordered 10 electric buses from VDL.

Arnhem
Arnhem has the Netherlands's only trolleybus network, which opened in 1949 and operates 46 articulated buses on six routes.

Eindhoven
On 11 December 2016 Hermes introduced 43 fully electric VDL 18-metre buses in Eindhoven, driving a daily distance of 400 km each. In 2017 this was the biggest all-electric bus operation of Europe.

Haaglanden
For use on its Haaglanden network EBS is using 116 electric buses:
 23 VDL Citea LLE 99 Electrics for Zoetermeer and Delft
 93 Mercedes-Benz Citaro NGT Hybrids for other routes (83  and 10  articulated)

Rotterdam
In 2018 Rotterdam ordered 55 electric buses from VDL and in 2019 obtained a European Investment Bank loan to buy a further 105 electric and 103 hybrids.

Schiphol
Since March 2018, 100 VDL Citea articulated electric buses operated by Connexxion have served Schiphol airport. The buses have a battery capacity of 170 kWh and a range of 80 kilometres. They are charged during the day by Heliox 450 kW fast chargers, taking between 15 and 25 minutes. Overnight, 30 kW slow charges take 4–5 hours. They are powered by 100% renewable energy, from wind power and solar panels at the depots. The buses serve two different networks:
 R-net: routes 242, 342, 347 and 347 with a total length of 78 km
 Schipholnet: routes 180, 181, 185, 186, 187, 190, 191, 194, 195, 198, 199 and 287.

Since 2016 a fleet of 35 BYD 12-metre battery buses has provided airfield services.

Utrecht
In Utrecht, Qbuzz has operated electric buses since 2017.

Waddeneilanden
In April 2013 six all-electric BYD buses operated on the island of Schiermonnikoog. Arriva started running 16 electric buses on Vlieland, Ameland and Schiermonnikoog.

Poland
 Kraków (Cracow): In January 2016, first 2 Solaris Urbino 12 electric buses were delivered by Solaris Bus & Coach. In September 2016, further 4 Solaris Urbino 8,9 LE electric buses were delivered by the same manufacturer. A roadside charger was installed at a bus stop on Pawia street.
 Warszawa (Warsaw): In June 2015, Solaris Bus & Coach delivered 10 Solaris Urbino 12 electric buses. They are running on route 222. A further 20 electric buses are on order, first 10, manufactured by Ursus Bus, due to be delivered in summer of 2017 and further 10 Solaris Urbino 12 electrics by end of March 2018. There are also plans to purchase further 130 electric buses by 2020. 19 termini will be equipped with chargers, allowing buses to be topped-up using roof-mounted pantographs.
 Zielona Góra: In October 2017 MZK Zielona Góra order 47 electric buses Ursus City Smile 12E manufactured by Ursus Bus.
 Stalowa Wola: In September 2017 ZMKS Stalowa Wola order 10 electric buses Solaris Urbino 8,9 LE electric manufactured by Solaris Bus & Coach.

As of 2022, around 700 electric buses—not counting trolleybuses—from different manufacturers are operated in Poland, and there are plans to obtain another few hundred. The largest fleets are located in Warsaw (162 buses), Kraków (78 buses), Poznań (59 buses), Jaworzno (44 buses) and Zielona Góra (43 buses).  Trolleybuses operate in Gdynia, Lublin and Tychy, with around 250–300 in service.

Romania 
 Cluj-Napoca: In May 2018, Solaris Bus & Coach delivered 11 Solaris Urbino 12 electric buses to the local operator CTP Cluj, Cluj-Napoca becoming the first city in Romania to use battery-electric buses in public transport. (Electric buses in the form of trolleybuses were already in use in Cluj and several other Romanian cities.)  Another 19 buses are expected to be delivered in the future. The municipality's mayor, Emil Boc, announced that Cluj will have a fully electric public transport system by 2025.

Russia 

 In 2014 battery-powered trolleybuses started operating in Chelyabinsk. The remodeled vehicles can run up to 30 km on routes that lack wires.
 In 2018 electric buses were introduced in Moscow. The city government has signed contracts with GAZ and Kamaz automobile companies to supply the city with 200 fast-charging electric buses. After 2021, only electric vehicles are to be purchased. With the purchase of the 100th electric bus in May 2019, Moscow became the city with Europe's largest electric bus fleet. As of March 2022, over 1000 electric buses are in operation in Moscow. Drive Electro company had provided batteries for 400 out of those 600 electric busses.
 Russian based Electric bus manufactures are LiAZ (GAZ Group), Trolza (PC Transport Systems) and Kamaz.

Serbia 
 In 2016 GSP Belgrade, the public transport operator of city of Belgrade, launched dedicated electric bus line equipped exclusively with 5 electric buses, delivered by Chariot Motors. The line has a total length of 7.9 kilometres one-way and 13 bus stops.
 In 2022, the Belgrade public transport operator GSP Beograd put its 10 new Chariot e-buses into commercial operation, delivered by Chariot Motors and DAT holding.

Spain 
 Empresa Malagueña de Transportes (EMT), S.A.M
 Empresa Municipal de Transportes de Madrid 20 all-electric and 20 hybrid diesel-electric buses and since February 2017 one Iziar ie2.
 Councillor for the Environment, Figueres
 León: Minibus Tecnobus Gulliver in El Ejido
 Seville

Sweden 
 Västtrafik is running 10 electric Volvo buses in Gothenburg on route 55
  is running a fleet of electric Solaris buses in Västerås on route 1 to 7

Switzerland 

 transport public genève (tpg) introduce TOSA Flash Mobility, Clean City, Smart Bus a new system of mass transport with electric “flash” recharging of the buses at selected bus stops.

North America

Canada

British Columbia

 Vancouver electric buses have been in operation since 1948, TransLink operates 260 of them.
 Victoria – CVS Tours currently deploys North America's first all-electric double decker bus made by GreenPower Motor Company.

Ontario

 Toronto (Proterra, New Flyer, BYD)
 Windsor (BYD)

Québec
 Réseau de transport de la Capitale, Quebec City's public transit authority has integrated 8 electric buses to its fleet in 2008 to serve the Old City. The Tecnobus Gulliver buses can carry up to 20 passengers and runs on $3.25 worth of electricity per day.
 Société de transport de Montréal, Montreal, bus fleet going all-electric or hybrid by 2029. 2017 – Cité-Mobilité project : 7 electric bus on line 36 with high-speed charging.

United States
About 650 electric buses were on the road in the US in 2019, about double the 300 estimated to be in use the previous year. In November 2019, orders for new electric buses had outpaced manufacturing capacity.

The 2021 Infrastructure Investment and Jobs Act included $2.5 billion in funding for electric school buses, to be distributed over five years. By June 2022, there were commitments to 12,275 electric school buses in 38 states. 

A 2022 study by National Grid and Hitachi Energy indicates that installing charging infrastructure for fleet electrification will require location-specific upgrades to the US electrical grid.

Cities using electric buses include:
 Anaheim, CA
 Atlanta, GA (at Emory University)
 Cambridge, MA (with the 71, 72, 73, and some 77 busses to and from Harvard Square)
 Chattanooga, TN – CARTA Downtown Electric Shuttle
 Colorado Springs, CO
 Dallas, TX
 Dayton, OH
 Denver, CO – RDT Free MallRide
 Frederick, MD
 Greenville, SC
 Gulfport, MS, with Mississippi's first electric bus in 2019
 Hampton, VA
 Indianapolis, IN
 Ithaca, NY
 Lexington, KY
 Los Angeles, CA
 Louisville, KY
 Miami Beach, FL
 Mobile, AL
 Nashville, TN
 New Haven, CT
 New York, NY
 Pomona, CA
 Portland, ME, received funding for Maine's first electric buses, operational 2021
 Portland, OR, introduced on line 62
 Philadelphia, PA
 Providence, Rhode Island The Rhode Island Public Transit Authority RIPTA is currently testing 3 electric buses on various routes around Providence.
 Reno, NV
 Santa Barbara, CA
 San Antonio, TX
 San Diego, CA
 San Francisco, CA, where electric trolleybuses are already commonplace on most SF Muni routes.
 Seattle, WA, which has a trolleybus network of its own.
 Seneca, SC
 Stockton, CA
 Tallahassee, FL
 Worcester, MA
 Wichita, KS

California 
Since 2000, the California Air Resources Board has had a Fleet Rule for Transit Agencies, which requires transit agencies to reduce emissions. In 2018 it issued the Innovative Clean Transit rule, which requires all new transit buses purchased after 2029 to be zero-emissions buses.

Long Beach, California and the Antelope Valley Transit Authority charge some of their buses on special wireless charging pads located along bus routes.

By 2019, more than 200 e-buses were in service in California. Several hundred more e-buses for California were in backlogged orders.

Total operating cost per mile
NREL publishes zero-emission bus evaluation results from various commercial operators. NREL published following total operating cost per mile: with County Connection, for June 2017 through May 2018, for an 8-vehicle diesel bus fleet, the total operating cost per mile was $0.84; for a 4-vehicle electric bus fleet, $1.11; with Long Beach Transit, for 2018, for a 10-vehicle electric bus fleet, $0.85; and with Foothill Transit, for 2018, for a 12-vehicle electric bus fleet, $0.84.

States without plans for e-buses 
In 2019, "only five states, Arkansas, New Hampshire, North Dakota, South Dakota and West Virginia, ... [had] no transit agencies planning to operate electric buses or hydrogen fuel cell buses."

Oceania

Australia

Australian Capital Territory
 In September 2017, Transport Canberra began operating two electric buses based at their Tuggeranong depot.
 In December 2020, the reelected ALP government announced that it would purchase 90 new electric buses for in 2021 with the aim to have Canberra's entire bus fleet converted to electric by 2024. Upgrades to bus depots would be completed during this time with Woden bus depot being the first to be upgraded.

New South Wales
 In 2016 Sydney Airport procured a fleet of six BYD electric buses to replace its diesel car park shuttles.
 Transport for New South Wales began a trial of electric buses on the South Coast before conducting a more expansive trial in region 4 in Sydney in 2019.
 In December 2020, the NSW government announced that it would roll out 120 electric buses across Sydney in 2021. Transport minister Andrew Constance also announced a goal to transition the entire state's 8000 strong bus fleet to battery electric by 2030.
 Sydney, November, 2021: A new rollout of zero emissions buses has begun as part of an ARENA-supported project. The buses will be charged from a solar array installed on the roof of the Leichhardt depot, storing energy in onboard batteries capable of holding up to ten times as much energy as an electric car.

Queensland
 Brisbane's new Brisbane Metro rapid bus system will use a fleet of 60 bi-articulated electric buses that visually resemble light rail vehicles. These buses will be supplied by Swiss-based manufacturer Carrosserie Hess.

Western Australia
 In July 2020, the WA government announced that it would trial four Volvo electric buses on Perth's Joondalup CAT bus route.

Victoria
 Melbourne's first fully electric bus began carrying passengers on Route 246 between Elsternwick and Clifton Hill in October 2019. The body construction and fit out for the new bus was carried out in Dandenong by Volgren.

New Zealand 

 In April 2018, Auckland Transport began a trial with two electric Alexander Dennis Enviro200 buses. These buses run on the City Link service around Auckland's central business district. The trial continues as of February 2019.
 In July 2018, Tranzurban introduced 10 electric double Decker buses in Wellington. 22 more buses are expected to be in service by 2021. NZ Bus have ordered 67 single Decker buses which will enter service between 2021 and 2023. 
 In June 2019, Red Bus introduced three Alexander Dennis Enviro200 bodied BYD K9 electric buses for use on the 29 Airport route.

South America

Aruba

 Oranjestad (BYD)

Brazil

Sao Paulo (BYD)
Campinas (BYD)
Sao Jose dos Campos (BYD)

Chile

 Santiago (BYD)
 Valparaiso (BYD)

Colombia

 Bogota Transmilenio and the Sistema Integrado de Transporte de Bogotá with 1485 electric buses of (BYD and Yutong) becomes the city in the world with the most electric buses outside of the People's Republic of China.

Uruguay
 Montevideo (BYD x 200 vehicles), (Yutong x 10 Vehicles) In 2013 Abriely imported for Uruguay-Argentina touristic transport operator Buquebus an BYD K9 for a tuoristic line in Colonia del Sacramento, that line proved infructiferous and the bus was sold in 2016 to Montevideo's biggest urban and sub-urban transit bus operator CUTCSA who numbered it ad the 2016 ("outside" the 1-1136 the covered by the 1136 units of the operator), at that service the bus proved that while constrained and limited by the battery capacity in the longer lines it could easily work in the shorter lines, so in 2020 CUTCSA acquired 20 BYD K9s for use on 3 exclusive electrical lines(CE1 Ciudad Vieja-Tres Cruces in replacement of the CA1 line with CE meaning "Centrica Electrica" or "Electric Centrical" while CA was "Centrica Accesible" or  "Accesible Centrical" being the 1st exclusive low floor bus line in Uruguay and a lower fare, E14 Ciudad Vieja-Pocitas replacing the 14 lines and the DE1 Ciudad Vieja-Carrasco line replacing the D1 line, D means Differential and refers to it being faster than another pre-existing line); in 2020 the other 3 Montevidean bus operators COETC, UCOT and COME bought respectively 4, 3 and 3 Yutong E12LF (also known as ZK6128BEVG) for use in non-exclusive lines (and in COETC and UCOT cases also the CE1)
Canelones-Las Piedras (Ankai x 6) Since 2019 the Bus operator Compañia del Este o Codeleste has been buying Ankai electric low floor buses for use in general lines of different models

See also 

 Battery electric bus
 Battery electric vehicle
 Capa vehicle
 Electric truck
 Electric vehicle
 Electromote
 Gyrobus
 List of buses
 List of electric bus makers and models
 Online electric vehicle
 Plug-in hybrid
 Solar bus
 Trolleybus
 Vehicle Automation:Passenger Shuttles
 Wrightspeed

References

External links

 New electric buses roll out on Sydney streets
 Electric buses, Citytransport.
 Electric buses, Clean Air Initiative (CAI), World Bank
 The Electric Tbus Group
 Advanced buses
 Sustainable Bus

 
Buses by type